John Douglas (14 July 1721 – 18 May 1807) was a Scottish scholar and Anglican bishop.

Douglas was born at Pittenweem, Fife, the son of a shopkeeper, and was educated at Dunbar, East Lothian, and at Balliol College, Oxford, where he gained his M.A. degree in 1743.

As chaplain to the 3rd Regiment of Foot Guards, he was at the Battle of Fontenoy, 1745. He then returned to Balliol as a Snell Exhibitioner; became Vicar of High Ercall, Shropshire in 1750; a Canon of Windsor, namely Canon of the Eleventh Stall at St George's Chapel, Windsor (1762–1776); a member of the chapter of St Paul's Cathedral in 1777; Bishop of Carlisle in 1787; Dean of Windsor in 1788; and Bishop of Salisbury in 1791.  As Bishop of Salisbury he was also ex officio Chancellor of the Order of the Garter. Other honours were the degree of DD (1758), and those of Fellow of the Royal Society and Fellow of the Society of Antiquaries.

Douglas was not an outstanding churchman.  He preferred to stay in London in winter and at fashionable watering places in summer. Under the patronage of the Earl of Bath he entered into several literary controversies. He defended John Milton against William Lauder's charge of plagiarism (1750), and attacked David Hume's rationalism in his Letter on the Criterion of Miracles (1754); he went on to criticise the followers of John Hutchinson in his Apology for the Clergy (1755). He also edited Captain Cook's Journals, and Clarendon's Diary and Letters (1763). A volume of Miscellaneous Works; prefaced by a short biography, was published posthumously in 1820.

A sister of his kept the British Coffee House, one of London's significant meeting places, especially for Scotsmen.

References

External links

1721 births
1807 deaths
People from Pittenweem
Alumni of Balliol College, Oxford
Canons of Windsor
Deans of Windsor
Doctors of Divinity
Bishops of Carlisle
Bishops of Salisbury
Fellows of the Royal Society
Fellows of the Society of Antiquaries of London
Scottish literary critics
Scottish military chaplains
War of the Austrian Succession chaplains
British people of the War of the Austrian Succession
Chancellors of the Order of the Garter